Henry Curwen may refer to:

Henry Curwen (1528–1596), Member of Parliament for Cumberland
Henry Curwen (died 1623), Member of Parliament for Cumberland
Henry Curwen (1728–1778), Member of Parliament for Cumberland and Carlisle
Henry Curwen (journalist) (1845–1892), editor of the Times of India